Joseph E. Brandle (October 8, 1839 – May 13, 1909) was an American soldier who received the Medal of Honor for valor during the American Civil War.

Biography
Brandle served in the American Civil War in the 17th Regiment Michigan Volunteer Infantry for the Union Army. He received the Medal of Honor on July 20, 1897 for his actions at Lenoir City, Tennessee.

Medal of Honor citation
Citation:

While color bearer of his regiment, having been twice wounded and the sight of one eye destroyed, still held to the colors until ordered to the rear by his regimental commander.

See also

List of American Civil War Medal of Honor recipients: A-F

References

External links

Military Times

1839 births
1909 deaths
People from Seneca County, Ohio
Union Army soldiers
United States Army Medal of Honor recipients
People of Ohio in the American Civil War
American Civil War recipients of the Medal of Honor